Herricks is a hamlet and census-designated place (CDP) in Nassau County, on Long Island, in New York, United States. The population was 4,295 at the 2010 census.

It is an unincorporated area, and is located in the southern part of Town of North Hempstead.

History
The school in Herricks was established in 1813, making it one of the oldest in Nassau County. It was named for Herricks Path, a path that existed as early as 1659. By 1898, the Herricks School was one of Nassau County's last single-room schools.

Geography

It is bordered by Searingtown Road/Shelter Rock Road to the north, Hillside Avenue to the south (vis-a-vis with Garden City Park), Herricks Road to the east and Marcus Avenue to the west.

Mail delivery is provided by the New Hyde Park Post Office, utilizing the 11040 Zip Code.

Demographics

According to the 2010 census, there were 4,295 people residing in the CDP. The racial makeup of the CDP was 52.6% White, 0.5% African American, 0.10% Native American, 43.2% Asian, 0.10% Pacific Islander, 1.1% from other races, and 2.4% from two or more races. Hispanic or Latino of any race were 3.9% of the population. 23.2% of the population are Asian Indians, 9.1% are Chinese and 1.6% are Filipino.

As of the census of 2000, there were 4,076 people, 1,349 households, and 1,121 families residing in the CDP. The population density was 7,284.4 per square mile (2,810.3/km2). There were 1,371 housing units at an average density of 2,450.2/sq mi (945.3/km2). The racial makeup of the CDP was 72.74% White, 0.29% African American, 0.10% Native American, 24.39% Asian, 0.10% Pacific Islander, 0.93% from other races, and 1.45% from two or more races. Hispanic or Latino of any race were 4.17% of the population.

There were 1,349 households, out of which 37.1% had children under the age of 18 living with them, 71.9% were married couples living together, 8.9% had a female householder with no husband present, and 16.9% were non-families. 14.9% of all households were made up of individuals, and 10.0% had someone living alone who was 65 years of age or older. The average household size was 3.02 and the average family size was 3.38.

In the CDP, the population was spread out, with 23.9% under the age of 18, 6.8% from 18 to 24, 25.4% from 25 to 44, 25.2% from 45 to 64, and 18.7% who were 65 years of age or older. The median age was 41 years. For every 100 females, there were 90.9 males. For every 100 females age 18 and over, there were 88.1 males.

The median income for a household in the CDP was $78,343, and the median income for a family was $84,451. Males had a median income of $55,125 versus $40,658 for females. The per capita income for the CDP was $31,518. About 2.4% of families and 4.5% of the population were below the poverty line, including 7.3% of those under age 18 and 1.2% of those age 65 or over.

Parks and recreation 

The County of Nassau maintains Herricks Pond Park, which is a passive park located within the hamlet.

Government

Town representation 
As Herricks is an unincorporated part of the Town of North Hempstead, it is directly governed by the town's government in Manhasset.

As of June 2021, Herricks is represented on the Town Board by Peter J. Zuckerman, and is located in its 2nd Council District.

Representation in higher government

Nassau County representation 
Herricks is located in Nassau County's 10th Legislative district, which as of January 2023 is represented in the Nassau County Legislature by Mazi Melesa Pilip (R–Great Neck).

New York State representation

New York State Assembly 
Herricks is located in the New York State Assembly's 16th Assembly district, which as of September 2021 is represented by Gina Sillitti (D–Manorhaven).

New York State Senate 
Herricks is located in the New York State Senate's 7th State Senate district, which as of September 2021 is represented in the New York State Senate by Anna Kaplan (D–North Hills).

Federal representation

United States Congress 
Herricks is located in New York's 3rd congressional district, which as of September 2021 is represented in the United States Congress by Tom Suozzi (D–Glen Cove).

United States Senate 
Like the rest of New York, Herricks is represented in the United States Senate by Charles Schumer (D) and Kirsten Gillibrand (D).

Politics 
In the 2016 U.S. presidential election, the majority of Herricks voters voted for Hillary Clinton (D).

Education

School districts 
Herricks is located entirely within the boundaries of (and is thus served by) the Herricks Union Free School District. As such, children who reside within Herricks and attend public schools go to school in the Herricks Union Free School District.

Library districts 

Herricks is located within the boundaries of (and is thus served by) the Shelter Rock Library District. The library serving the district, the Shelter Rock Public Library, is located within the hamlet.

Infrastructure

Transportation

Road 
Hillside Avenue (New York State Route 25B) forms the hamlet's southern border.

Other major roads which travel through Herricks include Denton Avenue, Herricks Road, Old Courthouse Road, Searingtown Road, and Shelter Rock Road.

Rail 
No rail lines pass through Herricks. The nearest Long Island Rail Road stations to the hamlet are New Hyde Park on the Main Line and East Williston on the Oyster Bay Branch.

Bus 
The n22 runs along Hillside Avenue at the hamlet's southern border. This bus line is operated by Nassau Inter-County Express (NICE).

Utilities

Natural gas 
National Grid USA provides natural gas to homes and businesses that are hooked up to natural gas lines in Herricks.

Power 
PSEG Long Island provides power to all homes and businesses within Herricks.

Sewage 
All of Herricks is connected to sanitary sewers, which are part of the Nassau County Sewage District, which handles and treats the hamlet's sanitary waste.

Water 
Herricks is located within the boundaries of the Garden City Park Water District, which provides the entire hamlet with water.

See also
Herricks Union Free School District
Herricks High School

References

Town of North Hempstead, New York
Census-designated places in New York (state)
Hamlets in New York (state)
Census-designated places in Nassau County, New York
Hamlets in Nassau County, New York